The American Iron and Steel Institute is an association of North American steel producers. With its predecessor organizations, is one of the oldest trade associations in the United States, dating back to 1855. It assumed its present form in 1908, with Judge Elbert H. Gary, chairman of the United States Steel Corporation, as its first president. Its development was in response to the need for a cooperative agency in the iron and steel industry for collecting and disseminating statistics and information, carrying on investigations, providing a forum for the discussion of problems and generally advancing the interests of the industry.

The AISI maintained a numbering system for wrought stainless steel in which the three digits indicate the various compositions. The 200 and 300 series are generally austenitic stainless steels, whereas the 400 series are either ferritic or martensitic. Some of the grades have a one-letter or two-letter suffix that indicates a particular modification of the composition. In 1995 the AISI turned over future maintenance of the system to the Society of Automotive Engineers.

Elbert H. Gary Medal
Since 1927, the institute has awarded the Elbert H. Gary Medal, an annual medal named for its first president, to a leader within the North American steel industry. Recipients include:
1944: Quincy Bent
1991: Frank W. Luerssen
1997: Joseph F. Toot Jr.
2003: John T. Mayberry 
2004: Daniel R. DiMicco 
2005: David Sutherland 
2006: John P. Surma

See also
 World Steel Association
 List of steel producers
 Metal Building Manufacturers Association
 SAE steel grades
 Pittsburgh Steelers

References

External links 

Political advocacy groups in the United States
Iron
Steel